German submarine U-632 was a Type VIIC U-boat of Nazi Germany's Kriegsmarine during World War II. The submarine was laid down on 4 September 1941 at the Blohm & Voss yard at Hamburg, launched on 27 May 1942, and commissioned on 23 July 1942 under the command of Oberleutnant zur See Hans Karpf.

Attached to 5th U-boat Flotilla based at Kiel, U-632 completed her training period on 31 December 1942 and was assigned to front-line service.

Design
German Type VIIC submarines were preceded by the shorter Type VIIB submarines. U-632 had a displacement of  when at the surface and  while submerged. She had two shafts and two  propellers.

U-632 was fitted with five  torpedo tubes (four fitted at the bow and one at the stern), fourteen torpedoes, one  SK C/35 naval gun, 220 rounds, and one twin  C/30 anti-aircraft gun. The boat had a complement of between forty-four and sixty.

Service history
Operating from Brest, France, U-632 went on two war patrols. On the second patrol, while operating against Convoy HX 231, U-632 sank the Dutch cargo ship  after chasing her for more than nine hours and having twice missed her target. Later that day Liberator of No. 86 Squadron RAF detected U-632 and sank her with five depth charges southwest of Iceland in position  on 6 April 1943. All 48 crew members were killed in the attack.

Summary of raiding history

References

Bibliography

External links

German Type VIIC submarines
1942 ships
Ships built in Hamburg
U-boats commissioned in 1942
U-boats sunk in 1943
U-boats sunk by British aircraft
U-boats sunk by depth charges
Maritime incidents in April 1943
World War II shipwrecks in the Atlantic Ocean
Ships lost with all hands
World War II submarines of Germany